Regional elections were held on 22 September 2019 to determine the composition of the Legislative Assembly of the Autonomous Region of Madeira in Portugal. All 47 members of the Assembly were up for election.

The Social Democratic Party continued their 43-year streak of being the largest party in the Madeiran legislature, but failed to hold on to their absolute majority, and would require a coalition for the first time to remain in power. The party won 39% of the votes, a decrease of 5%, and lost 3 members of the regional party. In the electoral map, the PSD lost the two biggest cities in Madeira, Funchal and Santa Cruz to the PS, although by less than 2% of the vote. Overall, the PSD still won the majority of municipalities, obtaining victory in 7 of the 11 in Madeira.

The Socialist Party surged in these elections, polling just two seats and 3.6% behind the PSD. It was the best showing of the PS in a regional election in Madeira going back to the first regional elections in 1976, two years after the fall of the dictatorship. The party won 4 of the 11 municipalities in Madeira. The People's Party lost a lot of votes and seats in these elections, winning just 3 seats and 5.8% of the vote. Together for the People (JPP) also suffered a big setback by losing 2 members and almost 5% of the votes. It even failed to obtain second place in their traditional bastion of Santa Cruz, falling behind the PS and PSD. The Unitary Democratic Coalition lost 1 of their 2 seats, and lost 3.7% of votes compared to 2015. The Left Bloc was wiped from the regional Assembly completely and only won 1.7% of the votes. These elections were fought mainly between the PSD and PS, and many left-wing voters opted to vote tactically for the PS to prevent another PSD victory, but by doing so, they hurt the chances of smaller left-wing parties and alliances such as the Left Bloc and CDU.

The turnout in these elections increased compared to the previous one for the first time in over a decade, with 55.5% of voters casting a ballot, compared with the record-low 49.6% in the 2015 elections.

Electoral system
The current 47 members of the Madeiran regional parliament are elected in a single constituency by proportional representation under the D'Hondt method, coinciding with the territory of the Region.

Parties

Current composition
The table below lists parties represented in the Legislative Assembly of Madeira before the election.

Parties running in the election
17 parties are in the ballot for the 2019 Madeira regional election. The parties that will contest the election and their lead candidates, are: (parties/coalitions are ordered by the way they will appear on the ballot)

 Democratic Republican Party (PDR), Filipe Rebelo
 Enough (CH), Miguel Teixeira
 National Renovator Party (PNR), Álvaro Araújo
 Left Bloc (BE), Paulino Ascenção
 Socialist Party (PS), Paulo Cafôfo
 People-Animals-Nature (PAN), João Henrique de Freitas
 Alliance (A), Joaquim Sousa
 Earth Party (MPT), Valter Rodrigues
 Portuguese Workers' Communist Party (PCTP/MRPP), Fernanda Calaça
 Social Democratic Party (PSD), Miguel Albuquerque
 Liberal Initiative (IL), Nuno Morna
 Portuguese Labour Party (PTP), Raquel Coelho
 United Party of Retirees and Pensioners (PURP), Rafael Macedo
 CDS – People's Party (CDS-PP), Rui Barreto
 Unitary Democratic Coalition (CDU), Edgar Silva
 Together for the People (JPP), Élvio Sousa
 React, Include, Recycle (RIR), Roberto Vieira

Campaign period

Party slogans

Candidates' debates

Opinion polls

Graphical summary

Polling

Results
On election night, the centre-right PSD and national-conservative CDS said they were willing to form a coalition government.

|-
| colspan=11| 
|-
! rowspan="2" colspan=2 style="background-color:#E9E9E9" align=left|Parties
! rowspan="2" style="background-color:#E9E9E9" align=right|Votes
! rowspan="2" style="background-color:#E9E9E9" align=right|%
! rowspan="2" style="background-color:#E9E9E9" align=right|±pp swing
! colspan="5" style="background-color:#E9E9E9" align="center"|MPs
! rowspan="2" style="background-color:#E9E9E9;text-align:right;" |MPs %/votes %
|- style="background-color:#E9E9E9"
! style="background-color:#E9E9E9;text-align:center;"|2015
! style="background-color:#E9E9E9;text-align:center;"| 2019
! style="background-color:#E9E9E9" align=right|±
! style="background-color:#E9E9E9" align=right|%
! style="background-color:#E9E9E9" align=right|±
|-
| 
||56,449||39.42||4.9||24||21||3||44.68||6.4||1.13
|-
| 
||51,207||35.76||||5||19||14||40.43||29.8||1.13
|-
| 
||8,246||5.76||8.0||7||3||4||6.38||8.5||1.11
|-
| 
||7,830||5.47||4.8||5||3||2||6.38||4.3||1.17
|-
| 
||2,577||1.80||3.7||2||1||1||2.13||2.1||1.18
|-
| 
||2,489||1.74||2.1||2||0||2||0.00||4.2||0.0
|-
|style="width: 10px" bgcolor=teal align="center" | 
|align=left|People-Animals-Nature
||2,095||1.46||||0||0||0||0.00||0.0||0.0
|-
|style="width: 10px" bgcolor=yellow align="center" | 
|align=left|United Party of Retirees and Pensioners
||1,766||1.23||||||0||||0.00||||0.0
|-
|style="width: 10px" bgcolor=LightSeaGreen align="center" | 
|align=left|React, Include, Recycle
||1,749||1.22||||||0||||0.00||||0.0
|-
|style="width: 10px" bgcolor=#CC0033 align="center" | 
|align=left|Labour
||1,426||1.00||||1||0||1||0.00||2.1||0.0
|-
|style="width: 10px" bgcolor=#6AD1E3 align="center" | 
|align=left|Alliance
||766||0.53||||||0||||0.00||||0.0
|-
|style="width: 10px" bgcolor=#00ADEF align="center" | 
|align=left|Liberal Initiative
||762||0.53||||||0||||0.00||||0.0
|-
|style="width: 10px" bgcolor=#202056 align="center" | 
|align=left|CHEGA
||619||0.43||||||0||||0.00||||0.0
|-
|style="width: 10px" bgcolor=black align="center" | 
|align=left|Democratic Republican
||603||0.42||||||0||||0.00||||0.0
|-
| 
||601||0.42||1.3||0||0||0||0.00||0.0||0.0
|-
| 
||507||0.35||||0||0||0||0.00||0.0||0.0
|-
| 
||274||0.19||0.6||0||0||0||0.00||0.0||0.0
|-
|colspan=2 align=left style="background-color:#E9E9E9"|Total valid
|width="50" align="right" style="background-color:#E9E9E9"|139,966
|width="40" align="right" style="background-color:#E9E9E9"|97.74
|width="40" align="right" style="background-color:#E9E9E9"|2.1
|width="40" align="right" style="background-color:#E9E9E9"|47
|width="40" align="right" style="background-color:#E9E9E9"|47
|width="40" align="right" style="background-color:#E9E9E9"|0
|width="40" align="right" style="background-color:#E9E9E9"|100.00
|width="40" align="right" style="background-color:#E9E9E9"|0.0
|width="40" align="right" style="background-color:#E9E9E9"|—
|-
|colspan=2|Blank ballots
||700||0.49||0.5||colspan=6 rowspan=4|
|-
|colspan=2|Invalid ballots
||2,534||1.77||1.6
|-
|colspan=2 align=left style="background-color:#E9E9E9"|Total
|width="50" align="right" style="background-color:#E9E9E9"|143,200
|width="40" align="right" style="background-color:#E9E9E9"|100.00
|width="40" align="right" style="background-color:#E9E9E9"|
|-
|colspan=2|Registered voters/turnout
||258,005||55.50||5.8
|-
| colspan=11 align=left | Source: Comissão Nacional de Eleições
|}

Maps

See also
Madeira

Notes

References

External links
Election results
Comissão Nacional de Eleições
ERC - Official publication of polls

Elections in Madeira
Madeiran regional electio
September 2019 events in Portugal